Nazir or Nazeer may refer to:

 Nazir (title)
 Nazir (name)
 Nazirite, in the Hebrew Bible, one who took the ascetic vow described in Numbers 6:1-21
 Nazir (Talmud), a tractate of the Talmud dealing with Nazirites
 Nazeer (horse), an Arabian stallion of "straight Egyptian" bloodlines

See also 
 Naseer (disambiguation)
 Nasir (name)
 Nazar (disambiguation)